The Bounder is a British sitcom which ran from 16 April 1982 to 28 October 1983, made by Yorkshire Television. The series starred Peter Bowles (of To the Manor Born fame) as Howard Booth, an ex-convict who served two years in jail. He lives with his brother-in-law, Trevor Mountjoy (George Cole), and his sister (Trevor's wife), Mary (Rosalind Ayres). The latter left after Series One in 1982. It also starred Isla Blair as the next door widowed neighbour, Laura Miles. This series was created by Eric Chappell.

Production
The Bounder was specifically written by Eric Chappell for Peter Bowles to play the lead role. The pair had first worked together on a 1977 episode of Rising Damp and then the four series of Only When I Laugh which aired between 1979 and 1982. Chappell told the Reading Evening Post in 1982, "Peter played the part [in Rising Damp] with such flamboyancy and style. It was the first time I had seen him in situation comedy and he did it so beautifully. He was a natural choice to play Archie Glover [in] Only When I Laugh. And, after watching his performance in the hospital comedy, I thought it would be marvellous to create a likeable rogue who had all the qualities we had seen conveyed by Peter."

Bowles aired his delight at the series to the Reading Evening Post, "It's the first time I have had a series written for me, and I'm thrilled and very enthusiastic about it. I'm also delighted to be working with George Cole for the first time. He is a master of comedy character roles."

Series 1

(Episode 1) He’s not Heavy, he’s my Brother-in-law
Howard Booth, a smoothly plausible former investment manager, emerges from prison after serving two years for fraud. Having nowhere to go and no funds, he imposes himself on his trusting younger sister Mary and her cynical estate agent husband, Trevor Mountjoy.

(Episode 2) Howard at the Majestic
Determined to treat Trevor and Mary to a wedding anniversary dinner at a posh hotel, Howard cons his way into a private party, pretending to be a school old boy. After being exposed by the manager, he attempts to impersonate the head waiter. Despite his initially successful plan, he comes badly unstuck.
Guest stars: Ronnie Stevens as Hotel manager; Glyn Owen as ‘Nipper’; Dennis Ramsden as Charles; Alan Curtis as Toby; Arnold Diamond as Diner

(Episode 3) We’ll go no more a-Roving’
Howard romances Laura, a well-off widowed neighbour. Having done some creative writing whilst in prison, he pretends to be a dashing novelist and romantic poet. But she soon learns the truth.

(Episode 4) Raising the Wind
When Trevor won't advance Howard a small loan, he cons a bank manager into investing in an African diamond mine he claims to have discovered during a fictitious trip to Africa. But the scheme is quickly exposed as a fraud.
Guest stars: Larry Martyn as window cleaner; Garfield Morgan as bank manager

(Episode 5) On Approval
Howard gives Laura a £7000 diamond bracelet, which he's obtained on approval using Trevor's name. Laura likes it and Howard has to face paying for it or persuading her to reject it.

(Episode 6) Suspicion
Howard and Trevor are shopping at an expensive clothes shop, but Howard spots his former cellmate ‘Greasy" at his usual occupation - shoplifting. When Greasy slips the purloined items into Trevor's shopping bag, Howard has to do some quick thinking, including impersonating a police officer.
Guest stars: Ken Jones as ‘Greasy Spriggs; Tony Steedman as Cutforth

(Episode 7) The Rival
Laura is being wooed by an Italian, Count Montefiore, which leads Howard to jealousy. He engages an enquiry agent to check up on the Count and see if he’s really who he claims to be. But the investigator mistakenly checks Howard out, rather than the Count.
Guest stars: Stephen Greif as Count Montefiore; John Rapley as Enquiry agent; Frank Coda as Waiter

Series 2

(Episode 1) A Tale of the Unexpected
Mary has left Trevor and the house is a mess. Trevor engages a cleaning woman, but Howard thinks she’s Trevor’s girlfriend and scares her into leaving. 
Guest star: Sharon Duce as Doreen Brent

(Episode 2) Matchmaker
Howard starts the HB Matrimonial Agency, but the first (and only) two clients are dissatisfied with his bumbling efforts and demand their money back.
Guest stars: Michael Robbins as Bert; Frances de la Tour as Celia

(Episode 3) Raffles
Laura’s house is burgled and her jewellery stolen. The police suspect it’s the work of a known thief, nicknamed ‘Raffles’, but Howard's criminal record causes them to suspect him instead. Howard discovers Raffles breaking into Trevor's house, but realises it's really ‘Greasy’, who he shared a cell with in prison.
Guest stars: Ken Wynne as Raffles/Greasy Spriggs; James Grout as DS Evans

(Episode 4) Love me - Love my Dog
Howard is still smitten with Laura, but she isn't as gullible as he supposes and resists his advances. To compound her resistance, she acquires ‘Sabre’, a German Shepherd Dog, who takes Howard's presence as a threat. 
Guest star: Tim Stern as Potter

(Episode 5) Third Party
Howard and Laura believe that Mary is seeing another man, but it turns out that he's only trying to sell her insurance. But then Laura falls for him – or does she? 
Guest star: Michael Culver as Reggie Thorne

(Episode 6) A Genuine Simpson
Howard meets ‘Softly’ Simpson, a painter and forger he knew in prison, and persuades him to paint Trevor. But the painting looks more like the portrait of the Duke of Wellington on a five-pound note (withdrawn in 1991) than Trevor. 
Guest star: Nicholas Le Prevost as Simpson

(Episode 7) Unreasonable Behaviour
Mary sues Trevor for divorce. Laura is attracted to Trevor, but Howard sets him up with Gloria, Trevor's secretary, who is already engaged. They all meet at a social function where Trevor is due to speak, and it's a disaster. Mary phones to ask to see Trevor, and he hopes for reconciliation, but the situation is left unresolved.
Guest star: Patricia Brake as Gloria Pert

References

External links
 

1982 British television series debuts
1983 British television series endings
1980s British sitcoms
ITV sitcoms
Television series by Yorkshire Television
English-language television shows